S. P. Jananathan (7 May 1959 – 14 March 2021) was an Indian film director and screenwriter who worked in Tamil cinema.

Early life 
Jananathan worked as an assistant to directors like B. Lenin, Bharathan, Vincent Selva and Keyaar. He was a treasurer of the Tamil Film Directors’ Union. He produced Purampokku in collaboration with UTV Motion Pictures. Apart from directing, he also served as a visual effects director for films like Dharma and Kumbakonam Gopalu, both of which were directed by Keyaar.

Career 
Jananathan's debut film as a director was the romantic drama Iyarkai (2003). Although it failed to deliver expectations in the box office, it went onto win the National Film Award for Best Feature Film in Tamil in 2004.

2006 saw him directing the thriller film E. Unlike his debut, this film was a commercial failure. His third directorial film, Peranmai, was an action-adventure film loosely based on the 1972 Russian movie The Dawns Here Are Quiet.

In 2015, Janardhan directed the political thriller Purampokku Engira Podhuvudamai, featuring Arya, Vijay Sethupathi, and Shaam. The film also saw the director making his debut as a producer.

His final directorial film was the 2021 film Laabam, in which he collaborated with Vijay Sethupathi for a second time.

Death 
Jananthan died on 14 March 2021 at the age of 61 after being unconscious for two days following a cardiac arrest. Prior to his death, he underwent treatment at a private hospital in Chennai and was under ventilator support. He was admitted in the ICU on 11 March 2021 by his assistants who found him unstable and unconscious at his residence in Chennai.

His final film, Laabam, was released six months after his death.

Filmography

References

Tamil film directors
2021 deaths
Film directors from Chennai
21st-century Indian film directors
1959 births
Tamil film producers
Tamil screenwriters
Film producers from Chennai
Screenwriters from Tamil Nadu
21st-century Indian dramatists and playwrights
21st-century Indian screenwriters